Henry Lawrence Island is an island of the Andaman Islands. It belongs to the South Andaman administrative district, part of the Indian union territory of Andaman and Nicobar Islands.

Etymology
Henry Lawrence island is named after Brigadier-general Sir Henry Montgomery Lawrence.

Geography
The island belongs to the Ritchie's Archipelago and is located between John Lawrence Island and Inglis Island. it is the second largest Island of the Ritchie's Archipelago, it has an area of 54.7 km2.

Administration
Politically, Henry Lawrence Island is part of Port Blair Taluk.

Demographics 
The island is uninhabited.

Image gallery

References 

Ritchie's Archipelago
Islands of South Andaman district
Islands of the Andaman Sea
Uninhabited islands of India
Islands of India
Islands of the Bay of Bengal